Hansschlegelia is a genus of bacteria from the family of Methylocystaceae.

References

Further reading 
 
 

Methylocystaceae
Bacteria genera